Renato Maria Giuseppe Schifani (born 11 May 1950) is an Italian politician who has served as the President of Sicily since 13 October 2022. Born in Palermo, Schifani was a prominent member of the now-defunct centre-right People of Freedom (PdL) and served in the Italian Senate from 1996 to 2022. He then joined the New Centre-Right (NCD) party in 2013 but he left it in 2016 for Forza Italia (FI), the PdL's successor. From 29 April 2008 to 14 March 2013, he was President of the Senate.

Biography

Berlusconi's chief whip

Schifani worked as a lawyer who specialised in trials at the Supreme Court of Cassation, the major court of last resort. He specialized in real estate regulations and became active in the debt collecting business. Filippo Mancuso, the former Minister of Justice born in Palermo, termed Schifani “the prince of debt collectors” (“il principe del recupero crediti”). Prior to joining Forza Italia in 1995, he was an active member of Christian Democracy. Elected in 1996 in the Altofonte-Corleone district in Sicily, Schifani served as Silvio Berlusconi's chief whip in the Italian Senate.

In 2002, Schifani was a protagonist in the attempt to secure the embedding of the provisional Article 41-bis prison regime – used against people imprisoned for particular crimes such as Mafia involvement – as a definitive measure in Italian law.

2004 Immunity Law (lodo Schifani)
Schifani and Antonio Maccanico, senator of the centre left L’Ulivo (Olive Tree) political coalition, gave their name to a bill aimed at granting immunity to the top five representatives of the State, including Silvio Berlusconi (although the other four were not facing trial). After extensive revisions of the text of the law by the Senate, Maccanico withdraw his name from the project.
The lodo Schifani decree was then approved in June 2003 by the Italian parliament guaranteeing immunity to Silvio Berlusconi. The law was subsequently declared unconstitutional by the Constitutional Court on 13 January 2004.

Similar provisions were included in the lodo Alfano Act (2008), granting immunity to the top four representatives of the State, including Berlusconi and the same Schifani as Speaker of the Senate.
After being granted immunity Schifani has sued his critics Travaglio and Tabucchi for slander, allegedly claiming 1.3 million from Tabucchi as the author declared in the transmission Annozero on 5 February 2009.
The lodo Alfano was declared anti-constitutional in October 2009 as well.

President of the Senate
Schifani was elected as President of the Senate on April 29, 2008, following the general election held earlier in the month. He received 178 out of 319 votes.

Alleged Mafia connections
In 1979, Renato Schifani founded and became managing director of the firm Siculabrokers. Enrico La Loggia (who would later become minister of Regional Affairs), Benny D'Agostino, Giuseppe Lombardo and Nino Mandalà were among its shareholders.

Benny D’Agostino is an entrepreneur convicted for Sicilian Mafia association, Mandalà was convicted for Mafia association and was indicated by the Court as the Mafia boss of Villabate, Lombardo was chairman and member of the board of Satris, a credit recovery agency whose shareholders were Nino and Ignazio Salvo, well known businessmen and Mafiosi of the Salemi “family,” arrested by prosecutor Giovanni Falcone in 1984.

According to the pentito (Mafia turncoat) Francesco Campanella, Antonio Mandalà and La Loggia in the 1990s agreed on the master plan for the shopping centre they wanted to develop in the town of Villabate, which aroused the interests of politicians and the Mafia. Schifani, La Loggia and the civil engineer Guzzaro -– the consultant who advised the town -– would share the consulting fees for drawing up the master plan. The master plan of the town of Villabate was designed under specific instruction of Antonino and Nicola Mandalà (Antonino's son who was responsible for the logistics to keep the fugitive Mafia boss Bernardo Provenzano at large). They conspired with the local Mafia families and politicians to skim from the public contracts.

In 1992, Schifani along with Antonio Mangano and Antonino Garofalo founded GMS, another credit recovery agency. Schifani's partner Garofalo was charged with usury and extortion in 1997. However, Schifani was not mentioned in the police investigation. In both cases Schifani has never been investigated for any Mafia-related offence, much less tried.

Media row with Travaglio
On 10 May 2008 the journalist Marco Travaglio interviewed on the RAI current affairs talk show television programme Che tempo che fa, talked about the Italian media. He mentioned past relationships between Schifani and men who have subsequently been condemned for Mafia association as an example of a relevant fact ignored by almost all Italian newspapers which published a biography of Schifani as the new president of Senate.

The statement of Travaglio resulted in fierce and almost universally negative reactions including from the centre left, except for Antonio Di Pietro who said that Travaglio was ‘merely doing his job’. Some called for chief executives at RAI to be dismissed. The popular political commentator Beppe Grillo supported Travaglio, while Schifani announced he would go to Court and blame Travaglio for slander. Schifani said Travaglio's accusation was based on "inconsistent or manipulated facts, not even worthy of generating suspicions," adding that "someone wants to undermine the dialogue between the government and the opposition."

President of Sicily
On September 25, 2022, Schifani would election Sicily's regional President in the 2022 Sicilian regional election. He would then take office after being proclaimed President of Sicily on 13 October 2022.

Electoral history

First-past-the-post elections

References

 Gomez, Peter & Lirio Abbate (2007). I complici. Tutti gli uomini di Bernardo Provenzano da Corleone al Parlamento, Fazi Editore, 
 Gomez, Peter & Marco Travaglio (2008). Se li conosci li eviti. Raccomandati, riciclati, condannati, imputati, ignoranti, voltagabbana, fannulloni del nuovo Parlamento, Milan: Chiarelettere

1950 births
Living people
Politicians from Palermo
Members of the Senate of the Republic (Italy)
Presidents of the Italian Senate
New Centre-Right politicians
21st-century Italian politicians
Forza Italia (2013) senators